Zhelezino is a village in the municipality of Ivaylovgrad, in Haskovo Province, in southern Bulgaria. The postal code is 6995, and 6965. The country calling code is +359. The latitude is 41.48333 and the longitude is 25.95.

References

Villages in Haskovo Province